James Little (1868–1 April 1946)  was a unionist politician in Northern Ireland.

Little studied at Queen's College and Assembly's College in Belfast before being ordained as a Presbyterian clergyman in 1900.  He was elected for the Ulster Unionist Party (UUP) at the 1939 Down by-election, but was upset when he was put up for re-selection before the 1945 general election, and decided instead to stand as an independent Unionist.  He easily topped the poll and was elected.  He refused to rejoin the UUP, and died a few months later.

His son was David John Little, a judge and MP.

References

External links 
 

1868 births
1946 deaths
Independent members of the House of Commons of the United Kingdom
Members of the Parliament of the United Kingdom for County Down constituencies (since 1922)
UK MPs 1935–1945
UK MPs 1945–1950
Independent politicians in Northern Ireland
Ulster Unionist Party members of the House of Commons of the United Kingdom
Presbyterian ministers from Northern Ireland
Alumni of Queen's University Belfast